William T. Elias, Jr. is an American football coach. He is currently the assistant head coach, linebackers coach and recruiting coordinator at Miami University in Oxford, Ohio, a position he has held since the 2009 season. From 1999 to 2006, he was the head football coach at Gannon University in Erie, Pennsylvania, where he compiled a 31–51.

Elias served as the athletic director at Gannon for three years before taking his current position at Miami. A 1977 graduate of University of Massachusetts Amherst, he is the son of former Virginia and Navy head coach Bill Elias.

Head coaching record

References

External links
 Miami (OH) profile

Year of birth missing (living people)
Living people
Delaware Fightin' Blue Hens football coaches
Eastern Michigan Eagles football coaches
Gannon Golden Knights athletic directors
Gannon Golden Knights football coaches
LSU Tigers football coaches
Miami RedHawks football coaches
Vanderbilt Commodores football coaches
Junior college football coaches in the United States 
University of Massachusetts Amherst alumni
People from Bedford, Massachusetts
People from West Lafayette, Indiana
Sportspeople from Middlesex County, Massachusetts